Springfield Park (or officially known as Umgeni Business Park) is an industrial suburb of Durban in KwaZulu-Natal, South Africa located north-east of the city centre.

Location 

Springfield Park is located approximately 10 km north-east of Durban's Central Business District (CBD) by road on the banks of the uMngeni River. Springfield Park is divided into two parts, the northern section (north of the uMngeni River) and the southern section (south of the uMngeni River).

Business 

The southern section of Springfield Park mainly comprises clothing retail, motor retail and hardware stores. The area is one of Durban's most popular retail nodes with two retail centres:

 Springfield Value Centre- located south of the M19 and mainly comprises factory stores
 Springfield Retail Centre- located north of the M19, adjacent to the Springfield Value Centre and comprises various retail stores

The Makro store adjacent the Springfield Value Centre is also one of the major features in Springfield Park, and is the only Makro within Durban proper. There are two other Makro stores within Greater Durban including one in Amanzimtoti, south of Durban and Cornubia, north of Durban.

The northern section of Springfield Park comprises various business such as home improvement stores, motor vehicle repair centres, packaging and timber amongst other businesses.

Infrastructure

Road infrastructure 

In the northern section of Springfield Park, the M21 is the thoroughfare linking the suburb to the N2 interchange in the west, Newlands West and KwaMashu in the north-west and the R102, Umgeni Park and Prospect Hall in the east.

In the southern section of Springfield Park, the M19 is the thoroughfare linking the suburb to Westville and Pinetown in the west and the Durban CBD to the south-east (via the R102).

The N2 highway bypasses Springfield Park to the west, linking the suburb to KwaDukuza in the north-west and Port Shepstone in the south-west. Access to Springfield Park from the N2 can be obtained through the M19 Umgeni Interchange/M21 Inanda Road interchange (Exit 170). The R102 North Coast Road bypasses Springfield Park to the east, linking the suburb to Briardene, Avoca and Redhill in the north and the Durban CBD in the south-east.

References 

Business parks
Populated places in eThekwini Metropolitan Municipality